Chris Heberle (born 30 June 1965) is an Australian cross-country skier. He competed in the men's 15 kilometre classical event at the 1988 Winter Olympics.He is the co-founder, together with Klaas Sybranda, of Intouch Technology, which was instrumental in the early development of software for the ski industry.

References

External links
 

1965 births
Living people
Australian male cross-country skiers
Olympic cross-country skiers of Australia
Cross-country skiers at the 1988 Winter Olympics
20th-century Australian people